Tatiana Kiseleva  (born ) is a Russian female track cyclist, representing Russia at international competitions. She competed at the 2015 UEC European Track Championships and 2016 UEC European Track Championships. She won the bronze medal at the 2016–17 UCI Track Cycling World Cup, Round 1 in Glasgow in the team sprint.

Career results
2014
3rd Team Sprint, Memorial of Alexander Lesnikov (with Natalia Antonova)
2015
2nd Team Sprint, Grand Prix Minsk (with Natalia Antonova)
2nd Team Sprint, Grand Prix of Tula (with Ekaterina Gnidenko)
2nd Team Sprint, Memorial of Alexander Lesnikov (with Natalia Antonova)
2016
6 giorni delle rose – Fiorenzuola
1st Keirin
1st Sprint
Memorial of Alexander Lesnikov
2nd Keirin
2nd Team Sprint (with Ekaterina Gnidenko)
2nd Team Sprint, Grand Prix of Tula (with Ekaterina Gnidenko)
UEC European U23 Championships
2nd  Sprint 
2nd  Team Sprint (with Natalia Antonova)
2nd  500m Time Trial
2017
2nd Sprint, Grand Prix Minsk
International track race – Panevežys
2nd Keirin
2nd Sprint
3rd Sprint, Grand Prix of Tula
Grand Prix of Moscow
3rd Sprint
3rd 500m Time Trial

References

1996 births
Living people
Russian female cyclists
Russian track cyclists
Place of birth missing (living people)